Primary education in Wales has a similar structure to Primary education in England, but teaching of the Welsh language is compulsory and it is used as the medium of instruction in many schools. The introduction of the Foundation Phase for 3- to 7-year-olds is also creating increasing divergence between Wales and England.

Stages 
In Wales, statutory education begins in the term after a child's fifth birthday, although many children start primary school earlier than this or their parents choose to home educate them. 

Under the 2008 curriculum, between the ages of 3 and 11 a child's education was divided into two main stages:

 Foundation phase -  (ages 3–7) (replacing Early Years (ages 3–5) and Key Stage 1 (ages 5–7)
 Key Stage 2  (ages 7–11).
Under the new curriculum, the key stages are replaced with "progression steps" with guidance of what level pupils are expected to reach at different ages. During the primary school years, these take place at age five, eight and eleven years old.

Curriculum 
Under the 2008 curriculum, schools were required to teach children in Key Stage 2 English, Welsh or Welsh as a second language, mathematics, science, design and technology, information and communication technology, history, geography, art and design, music and physical education. The foundation phase did not use traditional subjects instead dividing the curriculum into seven "areas of learning";

 Personal and Social Development, Well-Being and Cultural Diversity 
 Language, Literacy and Communication Skills 
 Mathematical Development
 Welsh Language Development
 Knowledge and Understanding of the World
 Physical Development
 Creative Development

The curriculum which is being formally introduced in primary schools in 2022 gives schools more freedom to decide what children are taught. Instruction is grouped into six different areas;

 Languages, Literacy and Communication
 Mathematics and Numeracy
 Science and Technology
 Health and Well-being
 Humanities
 Expressive Arts

The only specific subjects which all schools are obliged to teach are the English and Welsh languages along with;

 Literacy, numeracy, and digital competence
 Religion, values and ethics
 Relationships and sexuality education

Assessment 

Primary school league tables were abolished in Wales in 2001; a Bristol University study indicated that this had caused a fall in standards in about 75% of schools. Statutory testing for children finishing Key Stage 1 and 2 was introduced across England and Wales in 1989. It was abolished in 2002 and 2005 respectively. Being replaced with teacher assessments with limited oversight. In 2013, standardised testing was reintroduced for children in the later years of primary school in 2013.

See also 
Education in Wales
Home education in the United Kingdom

Notes 

 
Education in Wales